Patrick Phibbs (born 16 October 1981) is an Australian Professional Rugby Union player currently based in Reading with London Irish.

Career
Phibbs played his junior Rugby with Randwick DRUFC in the Sydney club competition. He represented Australia in the Under 19s squad and the National Sevens squad between 2001 and 2004. In 2005 he debuted against the Reds for the ACT Brumbies. Phibbs went on to play over 70 Super Rugby games while there. While in Canberra Phibbs also played for the Canberra Vikings in the ARC. In 2008 Phibbs was selected to represent Australia in the Australia A Pacific Nations Cup.

After seven years with Super Rugby side ACT Brumbies, Phibbs joined the Exeter Chiefs on a short term contract at the end of the 2011 Super Rugby Season. After impressing Head Coach Rob Baxter he was offered an extended contract for the remainder of the season   For the 2012/2013 Season Phibbs joined Heineken Cup Winning side the Leicester Tigers

References

External links
Brumbies Profile

Australian rugby union players
ACT Brumbies players
1981 births
Living people
Rugby union scrum-halves
Saracens F.C. players
Exeter Chiefs players
London Irish players
Leicester Tigers players
Expatriate rugby union players in England
Australian expatriate sportspeople in England
Rugby union players from Sydney
Australian expatriate rugby union players